Rotstein (Upper Sorbian: Hrodźišćo, meaning "hillfort" or "sconce") is a mountain ridge and its highest mountain in Görlitz district, Saxony, southeastern Germany, east of Löbau.

Within the structure of Natural regions of Saxony, the Rotstein Ridge forms its own microgeochore within the mesoheochore "Reichenbacher Lösshügelland" (11012) and the macrogeochore Eastern Upper Lusatia (11).

There are remains of a late Slavic-early German fortification built as a double wall on the southeastern crest of the Rotstein, hence its Upper Sorbian name.

References

Mountains of Saxony
Görlitz (district)